Anthene mpanda is a butterfly in the family Lycaenidae. It is found in Tanzania (from the western part of the country to the Mpanda District), Zambia and north-eastern Zimbabwe. The habitat consists of savanna.

Adults have been recorded in September and February.

References

Butterflies described in 1990
Anthene